Abu Sa'id Qansuh, also Qansuh Al-Ashrafi, Qansuh I or Al-Zahir Qansuh, was the twenty third Mamluk Sultan of Egypt from the Burji dynasty. He ruled the Mamluk Sultanate between 1498–1500.

Biography
Abu Sa'id Qansuh was originally a young Circassian purchased by Sultan Qaytbay. When Sultan Qaytbay discovered that he was the brother of his favorite concubine he was appointed dawadar, the protector of the Sultan's heir and the future Sultan, Muhammad. When Muhammad took over, the Mamluks grew discontent with the Sultan, rebelled, killed him, and elected Abu Sa'id Qansuh in his place. Facing another similar path as Sultan, the Mamluks became discontent with Qansuh. Qansuh tried to flee the palace disguised as a woman, but was caught and exiled to Alexandria.

Qansuh was supposedly strangled to death by the orders of the future Sultan Tuman bay I. However, he was overthrown and succeeded by Abu al-Nasir Janbalat.

Sources

16th-century Mamluk sultans
Burji sultans
1473 births
Circassian Mamluks